Hegnera is a monotypic genus of flowering plants belonging to the family Fabaceae.  The only species is Hegnera obcordata.

Its native range is Indo-China to western Malesia. It is found in the countries of Cambodia, Jawa, Laos, Malaya, Myanmar, Sumatera, Thailand and Vietnam.

The genus name of Hegnera is in honour of Johanna "Hansli" Cnefelius, née Hegner, a friend of the author of the genus, Anton Karl Schindler.
The Latin specific epithet of obcordata refers to the obcordate shape of the leaves. Hegnera obcordata was first described and published in Repert. Spec. Nov. Regni Veg. Vol.20 on page 285 in 1924.

Hegnera obcordata has the following synonyms; Desmodium obcordatum , Meibomia obcordata  and Uraria obcordata .

References

Desmodieae
Monotypic Fabaceae genera
Plants described in 1924
Flora of Malesia
Flora of Indo-China